Zauvijek tvoj is the fourth studio album by Montenegrin dance-pop recording artist Dado Polumenta. It was released 15 December 2008 through the record label Vujin Records, and was sponsored by DM SAT. Coincidentally, Dragana Mirković's album Eksplozija was released the same day as this album by the same record label and same sponsor.

Track listing
Kafe espresso
Ljepša od noći
Moja srno
Zauvijek tvoj
Bila je lijepa
Ti si bila meni sve
Majka
Dama
Nisam te se nagledao
Istina

External links
Zauvijek tvoj at Discogs

2008 albums
Dado Polumenta albums